Janne Kolling (born 12 July 1968) is a former Danish team handball player, two times Olympic champion and a World champion. She received gold medals with the Danish national team at the 1996 Summer Olympics in Atlanta and at the 2000 Summer Olympics in Sydney.

References

1968 births
Living people
Sportspeople from Aarhus
Danish female handball players
Olympic gold medalists for Denmark
Handball players at the 1996 Summer Olympics
Handball players at the 2000 Summer Olympics
Medalists at the 2000 Summer Olympics
Medalists at the 1996 Summer Olympics
Olympic medalists in handball
Viborg HK players
Expatriate handball players
Danish expatriate sportspeople in Spain
Danish expatriate sportspeople in Norway